Gaoussou Youssouf Siby (born 15 April 2000) is a Guinean professional footballer who plays as a defender for the Guinée Championnat National club Hafia FC, and the Guinea national team.

References 

Living people
2000 births
Guinean footballers
Guinea international footballers
2021 Africa Cup of Nations players